Bashar Shbib (born June 25, 1959) is a Canadian independent film director and producer. He started making independent films in Montreal the 1980s and became one of the most prolific independent filmmakers in Canada with over 30 films to his credit.

In the early 1990s, Shbib moved Los Angeles and directed his most successful films to date; Julia Has Two Lovers (1990) starring David Duchovny.

Biography 
Bashar Shbib was born in Damascus; he emigrated to Canada with his parents and two brothers at an early age. He attended McGill University in Microbiology and Concordia University, where he earned a Bachelor in Fine Arts in Film Directing.

His romantic comedies, Julia Has Two Lovers (1990) and Lana in Love (1991), were premiered at the Berlin International Film Festival panorama, the 1991 Montreal World Film Festival and the New Orleans Film Festival. Another of his comedies, Love $ Greed (1991), was in competition at the 1991 Montreal World Film Festival. Crack Me Up (1991), Ride Me (1992), and Draghoula (1994) soon followed. Shbib's recent release(s), The Senses (five feature films), has been aired on Radio Canada and several television networks worldwide. Shbib has also created less commercial works such as Evixion (1986) and Clair obscur or The Stork (1988).

In 2002, Shbib was hired to design and realize the landscaping in and around the John Sowden House in Los Angeles.

Filmography
 1983 : Or d'Ur (Short)
 1983 : Betsy (Short)
 1983 : Amour Impossible (Short)
 1984 : Memoirs
 1985 : Cazalla de la sierra (Short)
 1986 : Evixion
 1987 : Seductio
 1988 : Clair obscur
 1990 : 15 Ugly Sisters
 1991 : Julia Has Two Lovers
 1991 : Love $ Greed
 1991 : Crack me up
 1992 : Lana in Love
 1994 : Ride Me
 1995 : La mule et les émeraudes
 1995 : Bashar Shbib's Draghoula
 1997 : Hot Sauce
 1997 : Taxi to L.A.
 1997 : The Perfumer
 1997 : Strictly Spanking
 1997 : Panic
 1999 : The Kiss
 2005 : Silent Men

References

External links

1959 births
Living people
Canadian film editors
Film producers from Quebec
Canadian male screenwriters
People from Damascus
Syrian emigrants to Canada
Canadian people of Syrian descent
Concordia University alumni
Film directors from Montreal
20th-century Canadian screenwriters